Julian Terence Bailey (born 9 October 1961) is a British former Formula One driver from England, who raced for the Tyrrell and Lotus teams.

Racing career
Although born in the United Kingdom, he was raised in Menorca, Spain. He became an accomplished Formula Ford 1600 racer in Britain, winning the important Formula Ford Festival at Brands Hatch. In 1987 he got his chance to race in Formula 3000, in a GA Motorsport Lola, in which he won in only his third Formula 3000 race, becoming the first British driver to win a race in the formula. This attracted the attention of Ken Tyrrell, and Bailey was recruited to drive for the Formula One team the following year. The car was very uncompetitive and he did not score a single point, while his teammate Jonathan Palmer scored five. In 1989 he joined the Nissan sports car factory team, and tried to get back into Formula One in 1991 with Lotus. He finished sixth in the San Marino Grand Prix but didn't retain his drive after Monaco. During his Formula One career he was entered in 20 Grands Prix, qualifying for seven at a time when the grids were over-subscribed, and scored a total of one championship point.

In 1992 he joined the Toyota BTCC team, and the following season, he finished fifth in the championship, although his season is best remembered for his collision with teammate Will Hoy at Silverstone, which flipped Hoy's car onto its roof leading BBC commentator Murray Walker to quip "The car upside down is a Toyota!" (a pun on the company's UK advertising slogan "The car in front is a Toyota""). In the following round at Knockhill, he took his one and only BTCC win. The next two seasons were less successful, although he outscored 1991 champion Hoy in both their seasons as teammates. Toyota withdrew from the BTCC as a works team at the end of 1995, but Bailey was still contracted to them. For 1996, Bailey competed in the South African Touring Car Championship (SATCC) for Minolta Toyota. He has raced primarily in sports cars since. For 1997, Bailey joined Lister, eventually winning the British GT Championship in 1999 and the FIA GT Championship in 2000 in a Lister Storm.

Personal life
Bailey's stepson, Jack Clarke, is also a racing driver with experience in Formula BMW and Formula Palmer Audi. In 2009 he graduated to the FIA Formula Two Championship, and in 2014 moved to the British Touring Car Championship.

Post-racing career
In 2008, he joined with ESPN STAR Sports as a guest commentator for a number of Formula One races.

Top Gear
On the show Top Gear, he was one of several drivers to appear as The Stig.

Racing record

Complete International Formula 3000 results
(key) (Races in bold indicate pole position; races in italics indicate fastest lap.)

Complete Formula One results
(key)

Complete 24 Hours of Le Mans results

Complete British Touring Car Championship results
(key) (Races in bold indicate pole position) (Races in italics indicate fastest lap)

Complete Bathurst 1000 results

* Super Touring race

Complete British GT Championship results
(key) (Races in bold indicate pole position) (Races in italics indicate fastest lap)

References

1961 births
Living people
People from Woolwich
English racing drivers
English Formula One drivers
British Touring Car Championship drivers
Formula Ford drivers
24 Hours of Le Mans drivers
24 Hours of Daytona drivers
International Formula 3000 drivers
British GT Championship drivers
Tyrrell Formula One drivers
Team Lotus Formula One drivers
World Sportscar Championship drivers
Nismo drivers
TOM'S drivers